Atal Bihari Vajpayee Institute of Mountaineering and Allied Sports (abbreviated to ABVIMAS) is an Indian institute, which provides specialized training in skiing, mountain rescue and mountaineering, founded in 1961. The institute is located in Manali, Himachal Pradesh.

History 
In 1961, it was set up as the Western Himalayan Mountaineering Institute, but later it was renamed in 2008 after former PM of India, Atal Bihari Vajpayee. In 2017, the institute formed an MOU with Swarnim Gujarat Sports University for collaborative training.

Courses 
ABVIMAS offers mountaineering, skiing and water sports courses.
 Advance Mountaineering Course               
 Advance Skiing Course
 Method of Instruction (Skiing) Course
 Intermediate Water Sports Course (White Water Kayaking) & Advance Water Sports Course (Sailing)
 Intermediate water Sports Course
 Advance Water Sports Course (White Water Kayaking)
 Advance Water Sports
 Method  of Instruction (Water Sports Course)
Trained Trainers of Advance Mountaineering Course

See also 
 Mountaineering in India

References

External links 
 Official website

Mountaineering in India
Winter sports in India
Educational institutions established in 1961
Tourist attractions in Himachal Pradesh
Education in Himachal Pradesh
Educational organisations based in India
Buildings and structures in Himachal Pradesh
1961 establishments in Himachal Pradesh
Memorials to Atal Bihari Vajpayee
Mountaineering training institutes